Ceryx semihyalina is a moth of the subfamily Arctiinae. It was described by William Forsell Kirby in 1896. It is found in Equatorial Guinea, Ghana, Kenya and Uganda.

References

Ceryx (moth)
Moths described in 1896
Moths of Africa